The Art of Political Murder is a 2020 American documentary film directed by Paul Taylor, based on the book of the same name by Francisco Goldman. It follows the murder of Juan José Gerardi Conedera, a human rights activist who was murdered after presenting a damaging report of atrocities committed during the Guatemalan Civil War. George Clooney and Grant Heslov serve as executive producers under their Smoke House Pictures banner.

It was released on December 16, 2020, by HBO.

Synopsis
The film follows the murder of Juan José Gerardi Conedera, a human rights activist who was murdered after presenting a damaging report of atrocities committed during the Guatemalan Civil War, following the investigation that took place into the murder exposing more corruption and violence.

Book
Francisco Goldman,  who wrote the book on which the film is based, is the child of a Guatemalan mother and spent much of his youth in the country. Upon its publication in 2007, it was listed among the year’s best or notable books by publications including the New York Times, Washington Post, Chicago Tribune, and San Francisco Chronicle. HBO Documentary Films announced it would co-produce the screen adaptation of Goldman’s book in May 2019.

Production
In May 2019, it was announced HBO Documentary Films would produce and distribute the film, with Paul Taylor set to direct the film, with George Clooney and Grant Heslov set to serve as executive producers under their Smokehouse Pictures banner.

Release
The film was set to have its world premiere at the Tribeca Film Festival in April 2020, however, the festival was cancelled due to the COVID-19 pandemic. It was scheduled to be released on December 16, 2020.

References

External links
 

2020 films
2020 documentary films
American documentary films
HBO documentary films
Smokehouse Pictures films
2020s English-language films
2020s American films